Melica commersonii is a species of grass endemic to Chile (Limari to Arauco).

Description
The species is perennial and is caespitose as well. The leaf-sheaths are smooth, tubular and have one closed end. They are also have a glabrous surface that have reflexed hairs. The main panicle branches are appressed and scabrous with panicle axis being dominant and scabrous as well.

They have fertile spikelets that are pediceled, the pedicels of which are ciliate, curved, filiform, and hairy. Both the upper and lower glumes are oblong, keelless, membranous, and are purple in colour. Its palea have ciliolated keels and is 2-veined.

Flowers are fleshy, oblong, truncate, have 2 lodicules and grow together. The fruit is dark brown in colour and have additional pericarp with a linear hilum.

Ecology

References

commersonii
Flora of South America